Bleecker Street is an American film distribution and production company.

Released

2010s

2020s

Upcoming

Undated films

References

 
Bleecker Street Entertainment